Cejudo is a surname. Notable people with the surname include:

Álvaro Cejudo (born 1984), Spanish footballer 
Angel Cejudo, American freestyle wrestler
Henry Cejudo (born 1987), American mixed martial artist and freestyle wrestler
Vanesa Cejudo, Spanish sociologist